DCW234, also known as butyl 4-(butyryloxy)benzoate, is a synthetic nonsteroidal estrogen and a selective agonist of the ERβ. It shows modest selectivity in terms of affinity and transactivation for the ERβ over the ERα. Its affinity for the ERβ was 3.43 μM and for the ERα was 22.5 μM, while it activated the ERβ and ERα with EC50 values of 1.71–2.5 μM and 19.8–22.5 μM, respectively. As such, its binding selectivity for the ERβ over the ERα was 7-fold and its functional selectivity for the ERβ over the ERα was between 10- and 13-fold.

See also
 Diarylpropionitrile

References

Benzoate esters
Selective ERβ agonists
Synthetic estrogens